USLHT Shubrick was the first lighthouse tender steamer constructed by the Lighthouse Board.

The ship was built at the Philadelphia Navy Yard of "Florida live oak and white oak," left over from the construction of the warship . She was "...topped by a flush deck fore and aft... To better withstand buoys scraping her sides, Shubricks hull was painted black, topped with a white ribbon and waist.  Red paddle wheels, white paddle boxes, and a black bowsprit, yards and gaffs added a saucy touch to her long and graceful cutwater, with six inches of bright copper shining above the waterline."

History

Lighthouse Board: 1857–1861
Completed on 25 November 1857, she was placed under the command of Captain T. A. Harris, and set sail for San Francisco, California, through the Strait of Magellan on 23 December 1857, arriving on 27 May 1858 after a voyage of 155 days. Shubrick spent the next three years setting buoys and carrying lighthouse supplies along the Pacific coast.

Revenue Cutter Service: 1861–1866
On 23 August 1861, on the outbreak of the Civil War, she was transferred to the Revenue Cutter Service.  Commissioned on 15 October 1861 under the command of Revenue Captain William Cooke Pease, she served under Revenue Cutter Service orders for almost four years, performing customs and law enforcement duties, based first out of San Francisco, and then at Port Townsend from June 1862.

Port Townsend incident
In the early part of August 1862, Victor Smith, collector of customs, arrived to take possession of the customhouse at Port Townsend. The Pacific coast had been was alarmed by the advances of the Confederates in New Mexico and Arizona, their secret negotiations to secure the cooperation of the governments of Sonora and Chihuahua and the belief that their secret organizations were thought to be ready to attempt the seizure of the West coast.  For these reasons Lieutenant James H. Merryman, acting collector, fearing this was such an attempt declined to turn over the property unless presented with his papers of authorization.  The customs collector declined to furnish them but went to Shubrick, selected an armed guard, returned and demanded the customhouse be given up in fifteen minutes or it would be taken by force.

Lieutenant Merryman instead turned over the customhouse and papers to Lieutenant Wilson of Shubrick, who gave him a receipt for the papers and placed them on board.  A threatening attitude was assumed by the cutter, her guns were trained upon the port.  On 11 August, a warrant was issued for the arrest of Lieutenant Wilson and Victor Smith, but when the United States Marshal boarded Shubrick on her return trip, Lieutenant Wilson refused to obey the warrant and sailed away.  A month later the issue was resolved when both Smith and Wilson agreed to undergo an investigation.

Conspiracy to seize Shubrick 
On 15 March 1863, a schooner, called , had been seized in the harbor of San Francisco, just as she was preparing to put to sea as a Confederate privateer.  This seizure made the Union men everywhere along the coast more alert for other attempts to get a vessel for this purpose.  Among its papers was one letter disclosing plans for the capture of USS Shubrick but the scheme appeared to have been abandoned.  However early in 1863, Allen Francis, United States consul at Victoria, received information that led him to believe a plot was forming, to seize Shubrick, and convert her into a Confederate privateer.

Captain Pease, Shubricks commander and Shubrick made occasional visits to Victoria. In a Victoria newspaper had printed a report of a plot to attempt to seize Shubrick.  It was this which caused Consul Francis to have two private investigators to observe his movements very closely, and he learned enough to justify the conclusion that Shubrick was to be seized, with the captain's consent, while on the British side of the straits, and provided with a new crew which would willingly go on a privateering enterprise.  The consul communicated this to Secretary William H. Seward who was unsatisfied with the British denials that such a thing was going to happen.

Word was sent to the Customs Collector for Puget Sound to discharge Pease and most of the crew, all suspected Southern sympathizers.  This was accomplished by Lieutenant Selden, second in command on Shubrick, known to be loyal.  On the next visit of Shubrick to Victoria, while the captain and a large part of the crew were on shore, Selden threw off her mooring lines, and with only six men on board, he sailed away for Port Townsend. Captain Pease made no effort to rejoin his ship, but sailed from Victoria to San Francisco and then Panama, seeming to confirm the information that Consul Francis had received.

Remaining service of USS Shubrick
On 15 February 1865, Shubrick was transferred to the Navy Department for 90 days for special service in the Bering Strait supporting survey operations conducted by a Colonel Charles S. Buckley, the agent of the Russian Telegraph Company.  She then returned to San Francisco, and the Revenue Cutter Service, who in turn handed her back to the Lighthouse Board on 24 December 1866.

Lighthouse Board: 1867–1886
On 8 September 1867, while transporting building materials to the Cape Mendocino Lighthouse, Shubrick ran aground 30 miles south of the site. Considered a total loss, she was abandoned, but her chief engineer, Thomas Winship, was able to save her. Shubrick was rebuilt at the San Francisco Navy Yard at a cost of $162,399.12 and was placed back in service in 1869. She transferred to the 13th Lighthouse District in January 1880, and remained active for five more years, before being taken out of service in December 1885, and decommissioned the following month.

She was sold at Astoria, Oregon in March 1886. Her new owner ran her aground and stripped her of usable material, and then burnt her hull to recover all of her copper and metal fittings.

See also

 Union Navy

References

External links
 uscg.mil/history/: Shubrick, 1857
  The Coast Guard in the Pacific Northwest by Dennis L. Noble
 William Cooke Pease Collection, 1838–1906
  1863 news account of Shubrick Conspiracy

Lighthouse tenders of the United States
Ships of the Union Navy
Steamships of the United States Navy
Ships of the United States Lighthouse Service
Ships built in Philadelphia
1857 ships
Washington (state) in the American Civil War